The  is a rest area of the Kyushu Expressway between Chikushino, Fukuoka and Kiyama, Saga, Japan, with an expressway bus stop.

History
The Parking Area opened on March 13, 1975.

Bus stop

 is a bus stop, located in the Kiyama Parking Area, managed by West Nippon Expressway Company.

Outline
The bus stop has two platforms, one in each direction. The southbound platform branches off in different directions. 

From July 1, 2007, most highway bus services within Kyushu stop here where riders can transfer to destinations across Kyushu.

Bus services
For bus timetable, see
Expressway bus

Southbound directions

Northbound directions

Footnotes

References

External links
 West Nippon Expressway Company (official website)
 Highway Bus Routes and Timetable Information - Nishitetsu Kurashi Net (official website)

Rest areas in Japan
Transport in Fukuoka Prefecture
Transport in Saga Prefecture